Johnstown is an unincorporated community in northeast Bates County, in the U.S. state of Missouri. The community is on Missouri Route D one half mile west of the Bates-Henry county line. Butler lies 13 miles to the west-southwest. North Deepwater Creek flows past the southwest side of the community.

History
A post office called Johnstown was established in 1856, and remained in operation until 1916. A share of the first settlers having the first name John caused the name Johnstown to be selected.

References

Unincorporated communities in Bates County, Missouri
Unincorporated communities in Missouri